Bennett County School District 03-1 is a school district headquartered in Martin, South Dakota. It has three schools: Martin Elementary School, Bennett County Middle School, and Bennett County High School.

The district serves all of Bennett County. It includes portions of the Pine Ridge Indian Reservation.

In 2015 Stacy Halverson became the superintendent.

Operations
 the district has a $6 million budget, with $1.9 million of it being direct-aid from the state, or about 1/3rd of the budget. In turn 80% of the budget is used on salaries, so  reduction of employees would be needed if the budget was reduced.

References

External links
 Bennett County School District 03-1

Bennett County, South Dakota
School districts in South Dakota